Torgeir Kinne Solsvik (born 15 October 1979) is a Norwegian pianist.
He is listed among local artists in the magazine Harding PULS.

Discography

References

External links 
 Youtube - Torgeir Kinne Solsvik
 Festframsyning for Olav H. Hauge og Geirr Tveitt
 Brødrene Solsvik feirar Grieg
 In cooperation with mezzosoprano Kristin Mulders
 Samarbeid - Urframføring "Helgabrotet"
 Samarbeid og oppsetning med Os Mannskor
 Oppsetning Nordland Teater 2006
 Oppsetning Haringtonar 2010
 Artikkel

Musicians from Kvam
1979 births
Living people
Norwegian organists
Male classical organists
Norwegian male pianists
21st-century pianists
21st-century organists
21st-century Norwegian male musicians
Norwegian classical pianists
Norwegian classical organists